Kim Deok-Soo (born 24 April 1987) is a South Korean footballer who plays as goalkeeper for Siheung Citizen FC in K3 League.

Career
He was selected by Bucheon FC 1995 in 2013 K League Draft. He made his debut against Suwon FC on 16 March 2013.

References

External links 

1987 births
Living people
Association football goalkeepers
South Korean footballers
Bucheon FC 1995 players
Korea National League players
K3 League players
K League 2 players